Elith Foss (8 August 1911 – 19 April 1972) was a Danish film actor. He appeared in 29 films between 1933 and 1968. He was born in Århus, Denmark and died in Denmark.

Selected filmography
 De blaa drenge (1933)
 Blaavand melder storm (1938)
 Kampen mod uretten (1949)
 Skibet er ladet med (1960)
 Støv for alle pengene (1963)
 Summer in Tyrol (1964)

External links

1911 births
1972 deaths
Danish male film actors
20th-century Danish male actors
People from Aarhus